The 2019 Hamilton City mayoral election was part of the New Zealand local elections and was held on 12 October 2019 to determine the Mayor of Hamilton.

Key dates
Key dates for the election are:
 1 July: Electoral Commission enrolment campaign starts.
 19 July: Nominations open for candidates. Rolls open for inspection.
 16 August: Nominations close at 12 noon. Rolls close.
 21 August: Election date and candidates' names announced.
 20 to 25 September: Voting documents delivered to households. Electors can post the documents back to electoral officers as soon as they have voted.
 12 October: Polling day. Voting documents must be at council before voting closes at 12 noon. Preliminary results will be available as soon as all ordinary votes are counted.
 17 to 23 October: Official results, including all valid ordinary and special votes, declared.

Candidates

Declared candidates
 James Casson, Hamilton City Councillor
 Jack Gielen
 Louise Hutt
 Andrew King, incumbent Mayor of Hamilton
 Lisa Lewis
 Angela O'Leary, Hamilton City Councillor
 Paula Southgate, Hamilton City Councillor
 Mike West

Declined to be candidates
 Martin Gallagher, Deputy Mayor of Hamilton
 Geoff Taylor, Hamilton City Councillor

Endorsements
Louise Hutt was endorsed by Organise Aotearoa after surveying all the candidates.

Campaign
The Employers and Manufacturers Association hosted a debate at Wintec on 4 September 2019. Hutt, King, O'Leary, Southgate and West attended. Another debate was held on 11 September 2019 at the event centre in Claudelands.

Paula Southgate was motivated to re-apply for mayoralty, after missing out in the previous election by only seven votes. Southgate claimed that it is easy for mayoral candidates to make lavish promises but that at the council table, they're only one voice. Gielen's broom symbolized a claimed need for a clean sweep of council, while the colourful head attire was to represent an inclusive community.

A Waikato Chamber of Commerce and Waikato Times poll conducted on 2 October found Southgate with 20.4% support, King with 14.1%, O'Leary with 13.7%, Casson with 3.1%, West on 3.0%, Hutt with 1.8%, Lewis with 1.5% and Gielen with 0.8%. Undecided voters made up 41.5% of respondents.

Results

References

2019 elections in New Zealand
Mayoral elections in New Zealand
Politics of Hamilton, New Zealand